Davuthan is a village in the Adıyaman District, Adıyaman Province, Turkey. Its population is 294 (2021).

The hamlet of Dörtyol is attached to the village.

References

Villages in Adıyaman District

Kurdish settlements in Adıyaman Province